34 may refer to:

 34 (number), the natural number following 33 and preceding 35
 one of the years 34 BC, AD 34, 1934, 2034
 34 (album), a 2015 album by Dre Murray
 "#34" (song), a 1994 song by Dave Matthews Band
 "34", a 2006 song by Saves the Day from Sound the Alarm
 +34, the international calling code for Spain
 "Thirty Four", a song by Karma to Burn from the album Almost Heathen, 2001

See also
 3/4 (disambiguation)
 Rule 34 (disambiguation)
 List of highways numbered 34